The DG postcode area, also known as the Dumfries and Galloway postcode area, is a group of fifteen postcode districts in south-west Scotland, within fourteen post towns. These cover most of Dumfries and Galloway, including Dumfries, Annan, Canonbie, Castle Douglas, Dalbeattie, Gretna, Kirkcudbright, Langholm, Lockerbie, Moffat, Newton Stewart, Sanquhar, Stranraer and Thornhill. The DG16 district also extends across the border into Cumbria, England.



Coverage
The approximate coverage of the postcode districts:

|-
! DG1
| DUMFRIES
| Ae, Locharbriggs, Carrutherstown
| Dumfries and Galloway
|-
! DG2
| DUMFRIES
| New Abbey
| Dumfries and Galloway
|-
! DG3
| THORNHILL
| Moniaive
| Dumfries and Galloway
|-
! DG4
| SANQUHAR
| Sanquhar, Kirkconnel, Kelloholm, Mennock
| Dumfries and Galloway
|-
! DG5
| DALBEATTIE
| Dalbeattie
| Dumfries and Galloway
|-
! DG6
| KIRKCUDBRIGHT
| Kirkcudbright, Twynholm, Borgue, Dundrennan
| Dumfries and Galloway
|-
! DG7
| CASTLE DOUGLAS
| Castle Douglas, Gatehouse of Fleet, New Galloway
| Dumfries and Galloway
|-
! DG8
| NEWTON STEWART
| Newton Stewart, Wigtown, Port William, Glenluce, New Luce
| Dumfries and Galloway, South Ayrshire
|-
! DG9
| STRANRAER
| Stranraer, Castle Kennedy, Portpatrick, Sandhead
| Dumfries and Galloway
|-
! DG10
| MOFFAT
| Moffat, Beattock, Newton Wamphray
| Dumfries and Galloway
|-
! DG11
| LOCKERBIE
| Lockerbie, Johnstonebridge, Boreland, Ecclefechan, Kirtlebridge, Kirkpatrick-Fleming
| Dumfries and Galloway
|-
! DG12
| ANNAN
| Annan, Cummertrees, Brydekirk, Eastriggs
| Dumfries and Galloway
|-
! DG13
| LANGHOLM
| Langholm, Bentpath, Eskdalemuir, Arkleton
| Dumfries and Galloway
|-
! DG14
| CANONBIE
| Canonbie
| Dumfries and Galloway
|-
! DG16
| GRETNA
| Gretna, Gretna Green
| Dumfries and Galloway, Carlisle
|}

Map

See also
List of postcode areas in the United Kingdom
Postcode Address File

References

External links
Royal Mail's Postcode Address File
A quick introduction to Royal Mail's Postcode Address File (PAF)

Postcode areas covering Scotland